Johann Badum (2 March 1921 – 12 January 1943) was a German Luftwaffe military aviator during World War II, a fighter ace credited with 54 enemy aircraft shot down in approximately 300 combat missions. The majority of his victories were claimed over the Eastern Front, with three claims over the Western Allies in North Africa.

Born in Ruthweiler, Badum joined the military service in the Luftwaffe of Nazi Germany and was trained as a fighter pilot. He was then posted to Jagdgeschwader 77 (JG 77—77th Fighter Wing) in late 1941. JG 77 was based on the southern sector of the Eastern Front where he claimed his first aerial victory on 26 February 1942. Following his 51st aerial victory he was awarded the Knight's Cross of the Iron Cross on 15 October 1942. In December, JG 77 was withdrawn from Eastern Front and sent to Libya fighting in the North African campaign. There he was appointed Staffelkapitän (squadron leader) of the 6. Staffel (6th squadron) of JG 77. Badum claimed three more aerial victories before he was killed in action on 12 January 1943.

Career
Badum was born on 2 March 1921 at Ruthweiler in the Rhine Province of the Weimar Republic. By January 1942 Badum was serving with the Ergängzungsstaffel of Jagdgeschwader 77 (JG 77—77th Fighter Wing) on the south area of the Eastern Front. The official designation of the Ergängzungsstaffel was 1. (Einsatzstaffel) Ergängzungsgruppe of JG 77. It was a single supplementary training Staffel (squadron) commanded by Hauptmann Erich Friedrich and subordinated to the Stab (headquarters unit) of JG 77 at the time commanded by Major Gotthard Handrick.

On 26 February 1942, Badum claimed his first aerial victory. At the time, the Ergängzungsstaffel was based at Mariupol on the north coast of the Sea of Azov. That day, he flew a ground attack mission to a Soviet airfield at Yeysk, his sixth combat mission in total. Following the attack, his flight intercepted a single Petlyakov Pe-2 bomber which exploded in midair follow his attack on the aircraft. On 15 March, Badum successfully attacked two locomotives near the Mius-Front. Patrolling along the Mius, he claimed his second aerial victory on 22 March when he shot down a Polikarpov I-16 fighter. Flying four combat air patrols along the Mius on 31 March, he claimed a R-10 aircraft, referring to either a light bomber, biplane or a Seversky aircraft. The next day, the Ergängzungsstaffel was disbanded and the pilots transferred to the three Gruppen (groups) of JG 77. In consequence, Badum initially ending up in 5. Staffel of JG 77 led by Oberleutnant Anton Hackl, a squadron of II. Gruppe under command of Hauptmann Anton Mader.

Crimean campaign
Badum claimed his first aerial victory with II. Gruppe on 21 April over a Polikarpov I-153 fighter in combat along the Parpach Narrows during the Battle of the Kerch Peninsula. At the time, members of JG 77 where involved in Bandenbekämpfung, referring to anti-partisan warfare, including Badum. On 10 May, Badum made a forced landing in his Messerschmitt Bf 109 F-4 due to engine failure. On 8 June, on his 100th combat mission, Badum shot down a Lavochkin-Gorbunov-Gudkov LaGG-3 fighter during the Siege of Sevastopol, it was his eleventh aerial victory.

Author Prien, who has analyzed letters sent by Badum to his family at the time, states that Badum's thinking was firmly rooted in Nazi ideology and mislead by the Nazi propaganda. In these letters, observations made by Badum were misinterpreted due to the teachings of the racial supremacy of the Aryan race.

1942 summer offensive
On 28 June, German forces launched its strategic summer offensive in southern Russia named Case Blue. In support of this operation, II. Gruppe of JG 77 was ordered to relocate and moved to the area near Kursk. There, the Gruppe supported the northern flank of Army Group South advance towards the Don. Fighting over the combat area between Voronezh and Yelets on 12 July, Badum claimed three LaGG-3 fighters shot down.

Badum became an "ace-in-a-day" on 13 August. That day II. Gruppe flew combat missions in the area of Voronezh where Badum claimed six LaGG-3 fighters shot down. On 15 September, he claimed two LaGG-3 fighters and an Ilyushin Il-2 ground attack aircraft, taking his total to 51 aerial victories. For this, Badum was nominated for the Knight's Cross of the Iron Cross. He was awarded the German Cross in Gold on 3 October and the Knight's Cross on 15 October for 51 aerial victories claimed. The presentation of the Knight's Cross was made by Generalmajor Alfred Bülowius on 28 October.

North Africa, squadron leader and death
On 5 December, II. Gruppe of JG 77 was transferred to the North African theater, arriving at an airfield near Janzur, located west of Tripoli. The Staffelkapitän (squadron leader) of 6. Staffel, Hauptmann Erwin Clausen stayed in Europe because he had become ill with Malaria. During his absence, Badum was given command of 6. Staffel. Badum claimed his first two aerial victories in this theater of operations on 21 December. On a combat air patrol over the coast near Sirte, a Schwarm, a flight of four aircraft, encountered 12 Curtiss P-40 Warhawk fighters. In this aerial battle, Badum claimed two P-40 fighters shot down southeast of Sirte.

On 1 January 1943, Badum claimed his final aerial victory. In aerial combat near Buerat, he claimed a P-40 shot down. The aircraft may have belonged to Royal Australian Air Force (RAAF) No. 3 Squadron which lost two P-40s that day. On 12 January 1943, Badum was shot down and killed in action by USAAF Lockheed P-38 Lightning fighters. That day, the USAAF sent a formation of Boeing B-17 Flying Fortress bombers to the Castel Benito Airfield escorted by P-38 fighters. Badum was killed while defending against this attack. His victor may have been Captain Darrel G. Welch from the 27th Fighter Squadron.

Summary of career

Aerial victory claims
According to Obermaier, Badum was credited with 54 aerial victories claimed in approximately 300 combat missions. This figure includes 51 claims on the Eastern Front and three over the Western Allies in North Africa. Mathews and Foreman, authors of Luftwaffe Aces — Biographies and Victory Claims, researched the German Federal Archives and states that Badum was credited with over 50 victory claims, possibly three further in Tunisia and one unconfirmed claim. All of his confirmed aerial victories were claimed on the Eastern Front.

Victory claims were logged to a map-reference (PQ = Planquadrat), for example "PQ 35391". These sectors were then subdivided into 36 smaller units to give a location area 3 × 4 km in size.

Awards
 Honour Goblet of the Luftwaffe on 13 September 1942 as Leutnant and pilot
 German Cross in Gold on 3 October 1942 as Leutnant in the II./Jagdgeschwader 77
 Knight's Cross of the Iron Cross on 15 October 1942 as Leutnant and pilot in the 6./Jagdgeschwader 77

Notes

References

Citations

Bibliography

External links 

1921 births
1943 deaths
Luftwaffe pilots
German World War II flying aces
Luftwaffe personnel killed in World War II
People from Kusel (district)
Recipients of the Gold German Cross
Recipients of the Knight's Cross of the Iron Cross
People from the Rhine Province
Aviators killed by being shot down
Military personnel from Rhineland-Palatinate